Group A of the 1992 Federation Cup Europe/Africa Zone was one of four pools in the Europe/Africa zone of the 1992 Federation Cup. Four teams competed in a round robin competition, with the top two teams advancing to the knockout stage.

South Africa vs. Luxembourg

Ireland vs. Estonia

South Africa vs. Estonia

Ireland vs. Luxembourg

South Africa vs. Ireland

Estonia vs. Luxembourg

See also
Fed Cup structure

References

External links
 Fed Cup website

1992 Federation Cup Europe/Africa Zone